Sir John Lyndon (c. 1630-1699) was an Irish judge and politician of the seventeenth century. He was the first holder of the office of Third Serjeant-at-law, which was created especially for him, apparently as a "consolation prize" for not being made a High Court judge the first time he sought that office.

Early career
He was born in Carrickfergus, son of Captain Roger Lyndon, Collector of Customs for the town of Carrickfergus, and his wife Jane Marten. The Lyndons were a prominent Carrickfergus family who settled in the town in the 1590s, though at least one branch of John's own descendants were associated with Dublin. One Henry Lyndon was Mayor of Carrickfergus in 1600. John had at least one brother, also named Roger, who in 1666 married Dorothy Newburgh, daughter of Thomas Newburgh MP of Ballyhaise, County Cavan.

John was educated at Trinity College, Dublin. He entered Lincoln's Inn in 1657, although it seems that he was not formally called to the Bar in England, something which later caused him a good deal of difficulty when he tried to set up a legal practice in England. He was appointed Recorder of Carrickfergus and entered the King's Inn in 1663. He was seneschal of St. Patrick's Cathedral, Dublin. He sat in the Irish House of Commons as MP for Killybegs in the sole Irish Parliament of the reign of Charles II (1661-1666).

The first Third Serjeant
The office of Third Serjeant was created especially for him in 1682: this was widely regarded as a "consolation prize" for his failure to secure a place on the Court of Common Pleas (Ireland). The situation became comical when the office of Second Serjeant was given to William Beckett: both Lyndon and Sir Richard Ryves, the Recorder of Dublin, claimed that it had been promised to them. Ormonde, the  Lord Lieutenant of Ireland, took a keen interest in judicial appointments, but he did not regard the Serjeant-at-law as an office of much importance (probably due to his deep distrust of Sir Audley Mervyn, who had been the Prime Serjeant in the 1660s), and had always said that one Serjeant was quite enough. He frankly admitted that when he appointed Beckett as Serjeant he had forgotten that Lyndon had already received his patent of appointment to the same office. A compromise arrangement was reached by which Beckett remained as Second Serjeant; he died a few months later. Ryves was promised, and received, the next vacant Serjeantship, and Lyndon, in addition to becoming Third Serjeant, was promised the next vacant seat on the High Court bench. The desire to conciliate Lyndon suggests that he was highly regarded by Ormonde, who was noted for loyalty to his friends. No specific duties were assigned to him as Third Serjeant,  and the office was generally agreed to be surplus to requirements, at a time when the need for even two serjeants was questioned, not least by Ormonde himself, who had remarked years earlier that the Second Serjeant had nothing to do.

Judge

Ormonde kept his promise, and In January 1683  Lyndon was raised to the Bench as justice of the Court of King's Bench (Ireland). He was sent regularly to Ulster as justice of assize. In 1686-7 he was engaged in a dispute with his colleague Thomas Nugent as to which of them had precedence in Court: they are said to have quarrelled "as briskly as two women". He seems to have been in some financial difficulty at this time, as he petitioned the Crown for a licence to export wool, as a means of providing for his family. Despite their differences Nugent and  Lyndon, who had jointly presided at the trial for murder of William Aston, eldest son of their late colleague Sir William Aston, who was found guilty and hanged, worked together to secure the return of his property, which was forfeit to the Crown, to his widow.

The Glorious Revolution and afterwards

Although Lyndon was a sincere Protestant, (being a friend of Ormonde, he was most likely a staunch Anglican), the Catholic King James II, despite his policy of replacing Irish Protestant office-holders with Catholics in so far as possible, left Lyndon in peace until after the Glorious Revolution of 1688. James's arrival in Ireland in 1689 put Lyndon and the other remaining Protestants on the Irish Bench in a very difficult position, as they were naturally suspected of sympathising with the new  King William III. Lyndon and his wife tried to escape to England, taking their valuables with them, but they were arrested at the waterside and their goods were seized. His enemies claimed that Lyndon then agreed to preside at the trials of suspected enemies of the Jacobite regime, as a bribe for the return of his property, and he did resume his position as justice of assize in Ulster for a time. Later in 1689 he and his family were permitted to go to England, but without their valuables. His position on the Bench was left vacant, apparently because no barrister would pay the fee for the patent of office. His efforts to practice at the Bar in England encountered a difficulty when it transpired that although he had been a law student at Lincoln's Inn, he had never been called to the English bar.

Following the downfall of King James's cause at the Battle of the Boyne, Lyndon returned to Ireland, and was reappointed to the Bench in 1690 and knighted. He continued to go regularly on assize to Ulster. He died in 1699.

Family

By his wife Elizabeth he had a numerous family, including at least five sons, John, Edward, Charles, Richard and George, and one daughter, who married her cousin Cuthbert Winder. Lady Lyndon died in June 1711, a fact mentioned by Jonathan Swift in a letter to his beloved friend Esther Johnson (Stella): "your Lady Lyndon is dead". Their eldest son, Captain John Lyndon, was killed at the Siege of Limerick (1691).

References
Ball, F. Elrington  The Judges in Ireland 1221-1921 John Murray  London 1926
Hart, A.R.  History of the King's Serjeant-at-law in Ireland Four Courts Press Dublin 2000
Kenny, Colum "King's Inns and the Kingdom of Ireland" Dublin Irish Academic Press 1992
 The correspondence of Henry Hyde, 2nd Earl of Clarendon  with his brother Lawrence Hyde, 1st Earl of Rochester;  published by Samuel Weller Singer London 2 Volumes 1828
Swift, Jonathan  Journal to Stella  Letter 26, July 1711

People from Carrickfergus
Members of Lincoln's Inn
1699 deaths
Alumni of Trinity College Dublin
Irish MPs 1661–1666
Justices of the Irish King's Bench
Members of the Parliament of Ireland (pre-1801) for County Donegal constituencies
Year of birth uncertain
Serjeants-at-law (Ireland)
1630 births